Hyman Heights–Mount Royal Historic District is a national historic district located at Hendersonville, Henderson County, North Carolina.  The district encompasses 123 contributing buildings in a predominantly residential section of Hendersonville developed between 1905 and 1954. It includes notable examples of Colonial Revival and Bungalow / American Craftsman residential architecture.  The oldest house in the Hyman Heights–Mount Royal neighborhood is Killarney (c. 1858).

It was listed on the National Register of Historic Places in 2001.

Gallery

References

Houses on the National Register of Historic Places in North Carolina
Historic districts on the National Register of Historic Places in North Carolina
Colonial Revival architecture in North Carolina
Houses in Henderson County, North Carolina
National Register of Historic Places in Henderson County, North Carolina
Hendersonville, North Carolina